Michael or Mike Todd may refer to:
Mike Todd (1909–1958), American film producer
Mike Todd Jr. (1929–2002), son of American film producer Mike Todd and stepson to Elizabeth Taylor
Michael J. Todd (1957–2008), British police officer
Michael Todd (musician) (born 1980), American bass guitarist
Michael Todd (video game developer) (born 1987), Canadian video game developer
Michael Todd (artist) (born 1935), American artist
Michael Todd (rugby union), Scottish rugby union referee
Michael Todd (astronomer), Australian astronomer who has discovered several minor planets